Following is a list of senators of Lot, people who have represented the department of Lot in the Senate of France.

Third Republic

Senators for Lot under the French Third Republic were:

 Octave Depeyre (1876–1879)
 Paul Delord (1879–1883)
 François Roques (1879–1882)
 Eloi Béral (1883–1897) and (1906–1908)
 Henri de Verninac-Saint-Maur (1883–1901)
 Joseph Pauliac (1891–1906) and (1909)
 Léon Talou (1897–1900)
 Amédée Delport (1900)
 Jean Cocula (1901–1915)
 Jean Costes (1901–1906)
 Émile Rey (1906–1920)
 Joseph Loubet (1909–1940)
 Anatole de Monzie (1920–1929)
 René Fontanille (1920–1940)
 Louis Garrigou (1930–1940)

Fourth Republic

Senators for Lot under the French Fourth Republic were:

 Pierre Boudet (1946–1955)
 Gaston Monnerville (1948–1959)
 Marc Baudru (1955–1959)

Fifth Republic 
Senators for Lot under the French Fifth Republic:

References

Sources

 
Lists of members of the Senate (France) by department